Paul Young (born 1956) is an English rock and pop musician.

Paul Young may also refer to:

People

Arts and entertainment
Paul Young (actor) (born 1944), Scottish actor
Paul Young (producer) (born 1967), Irish animator and film producer, who co-developed The Secret of Kells
Paul Young (singer, born 1947) (1947–2000), English rock musician with Sad Café and Mike & The Mechanics
Paul A. Young (born 1973), English pastry chef
 William P. Young (born 1956), or Paul Young, Canadian author

Sports
Paul Young (American football) (1908–1978), American NFL center
Paul Young (footballer, born 1968), Jamaican forward
Paul Young (Vanuatuan footballer) (born 1988), Vanuatuan football defender
Paul Young (rugby union) (born 1983), Welsh hooker
Paul Young (motorcyclist) (born 1969), Australian Grand Prix motorcycle racer
Paul H. Young (1890–1960), American angler
Paul Young, tennis coach at Louisiana State University

Other people
Paul Thomas Young (1892–1978), American psychologist
Paul Young (politician), New Zealand politician
R. Paul Young, geophysicist

Other uses
 Paul Young (album), a 1997 album by English singer Paul Young
 Paul Young (Desperate Housewives), a character on the ABC TV series Desperate Housewives

See also
 John Paul Young (born 1950), Scottish-born Australian pop singer-songwriter
 Young (surname)